Lacis may refer to:

 Lācis, a Latvian last name
 Filet lace, a needle lace